Ezra R. Kanoho (September 16, 1927  January 23, 2022) was an American politician who served in the Hawaii State Legislature from 1987 to 2006.

Early life and education 
Kanoho was born on September 16, 1927, in Lihue, Kauai. He graduated from Kamehameha Schools in 1945, and went on to attend Kauai Community College and Honolulu Community College. After earning an associate degree, he worked for Hawaii Telephone Company. He also served in several community organizations. He had a wife and four children.

Career 
Kanoho was appointed to office by John Waihee in 1987 and was re-elected in 1988. He served on several committees including the committee on water, land, use, and Hawaiian affairs, the finance committee, the judiciary committee, the consumer protection and commerce committee, and the committee for energy and environmental protection. He was also part of the Hawaiian Caucus.

Kanoho retired in 2006. He died of heart failure on January 23, 2022.

References

External links 

 VoteSmart

1927 births
2022 deaths
Democratic Party members of the Hawaii House of Representatives
21st-century American politicians
People from Lihue, Hawaii